Gayton is a village in Wirral, Merseyside, England, located between Heswall and Parkgate. It is part of the Metropolitan Borough of Wirral. At the 2001 Census, the population of Gayton stood at 3,110.

History
The name is of Viking origin, deriving from the Old Norse Geit-tún, meaning 'goat farmstead'.
Originally part of the Heswall Parish in the Wirral Hundred, with the hamlets of Dawstone and Oldfield also included as part of Gayton. The village population was 100 in 1801, 144 in 1851, 180 in 1901 and 832 in 1951.
Before local government reorganisation on 1 April 1974, it was part of Wirral Urban District in the county of Cheshire.

William of Orange stayed at Gayton Hall in 1689 en route to the Battle of the Boyne in Ireland, and knighted his host, Sir William Glegg.

Gayton Windmill, built of red sandstone and Wirral's oldest tower mill, ceased operation in 1875. It has since been converted into a private residence.

Geography
Gayton is on the western side of the Wirral Peninsula, and is situated at the eastern side of the Dee Estuary.

Transport

Rail
The nearest railway station to Gayton is Heswall.

Bus
Services operating in the Gayton area, as of January 2015:

See also
Gayton Hall, Wirral

References

Bibliography

External links

 Photo: Gayton Windmill
 Merseytravel

Towns and villages in the Metropolitan Borough of Wirral